Alvin Hjalmar "Al" Loftes (January 1, 1890 – July 1971) was an American road racing cyclist who competed in the 1912 Summer Olympics.

He was part of the team, which won the bronze medal in the Team road race. In the individual road race he finished eleventh.

References

External links
 
 
 

1890s births
1971 deaths
American male cyclists
Cyclists at the 1912 Summer Olympics
Olympic bronze medalists for the United States in cycling
Medalists at the 1912 Summer Olympics